Interpump Group S.p.A. is an Italian company specialized in the production of high and very high pressure water pumps and one of the world's leading groups in the hydraulic sector.

It is listed on the Italian Stock Exchange in the FTSE Italia Mid Cap and FTSE Italia STAR index of the Milan Stock Exchange.

History
The company was founded in 1977 in the province of Reggio Emilia, in Sant'Ilario d'Enza. Initially production was linked to high pressure pumps and pistons characterized by small dimensions and new type materials that lead the company to hold 50% of the market in a few years.

Since the 90s it has begun to expand the areas of interest by acquiring other companies in the sector of professional cleaning machines and electric motors.

In 1996 it was listed on the stock exchange and from the following year it began to enter the hydraulic sector with targeted acquisitions of companies in the sector.

In 2005 the branch relating to professional cleaning machines was sold following a repositioning in the most technological sectors.

Group companies
 Water sector: Interpump Group S.p.A. (Bertoli; Pratissoli Pompe); General Pump Inc.; Hammelmann G.m.b.H.; Inoxihp S.r.l.; Inoxpa S.A.; NLB Corporation Inc.
 Hydraulic sector: Walvoil S.p.A. (Galtech; Hydrocontrol); Avi S.r.l.; Contarini S.r.l.; American Mobile Power Inc.; Hydroven S.r.l.; I.M.M. Hydraulics S.p.A.; Interpump Hydraulics S.p.A. (HS Penta; Hydrocar; Modenflex Hydraulics; PZB); Mega Pacific New Zealand; Mega Pacific Pty Ltd; Muncie Power Products, Inc.; Oleodinamica Panni S.r.l. (Cover); Takarada Industria e Comercio lta; Teknotubi S.r.l.; Tubiflex S.p.A.

Manufacturing sites
Interpump is present in the following countries with at least one of the companies in the group:
 America: Canada, US, Brazil, Chile
 Europe: Italy, France, Spain, England,  (Germany), Romania, Bulgaria
 Africa: South Africa
 Asia: United Arab Emirates, China, India, South Korea
 Oceania: Australia, New Zealand

External links
 Official site

References

Engineering companies of Italy
Companies based in the Province of Reggio Emilia
Technology companies of Italy
Italian brands
Industrial machine manufacturers
Italian companies established in 1977
Interpump Group S.p.A.
Companies listed on the Borsa Italiana
Manufacturing companies established in 1977
Hydraulic engineering
Companies of Italy